Bruce Jacobs (born March 27, 1975 in Cape Town, Western Cape) is a male field hockey player from South Africa, who was a member of the national squad that finished tenth at the 2004 Summer Olympics in Athens. Jacobs also represented his native country at the 2008 Summer Olympics in Beijing.

International Senior Tournaments
 2001 – Champions Challenge, Kuala Lumpur (2nd)
 2002 – Commonwealth Games, Manchester (4th)
 2003 – Champions Challenge, Johannesburg (3rd)
 2004 – Olympic Qualifier, Madrid (7th)
 2004 – Summer Olympics, Athens (10th)
 2006 – Commonwealth Games, Melbourne (8th)
 2006 – World Cup, Mönchengladbach (12th)
 2008 – Summer Olympics, Beijing (12th)

References

External links

1975 births
Living people
South African male field hockey players
Olympic field hockey players of South Africa
Field hockey players at the 2002 Commonwealth Games
2002 Men's Hockey World Cup players
Field hockey players at the 2004 Summer Olympics
Field hockey players at the 2006 Commonwealth Games
2006 Men's Hockey World Cup players
Field hockey players at the 2008 Summer Olympics
Sportspeople from Cape Town
Commonwealth Games competitors for South Africa